Aracus (409–370 BC) was a Spartan military commander and statesman. He served as ephor in 409–408 BC, and seems to have been a supporter of the foreign policy championed by Lysander during the Peloponnesian War. In 406, Aracus received the nominal command (navarchy) of the Spartan fleet, with Lysander as his secretary (epistoleus) or deputy. Lysander held the actual command of the fleet, and had only been assigned a position subordinate to Aracus because Spartan law did not allow the same man to hold the office of navarch twice.

In 398, Aracus led a commission to inspect Sparta's conquests in Asia Minor, to prolong the command of Dercylidas, and to negotiate with the Achaemenid king Artaxerxes II, though his mission failed completely. In 369, he was one of the ambassadors sent to Athens, as which he had greater success.

References
 
 
 

5th-century BC Spartans
4th-century BC Spartans
Ancient Spartan admirals
Ephors
Spartans of the Peloponnesian War